David J. Starr (born May 31, 1943) is a former Republican member of the New Hampshire Senate, representing the 1st district, in the extreme northern part of the state, from 2018 until 2020. He defeated Democratic incumbent Jeff Woodburn in the 2018 general election after Woodburn was indicted for domestic violence. This was Starr's first race for any elective office. Starr was defeated by State Representative Erin Hennessey in the 2020 Republican primary. He lives in Franconia and is a retired engineer and Air Force officer.

Electoral history

References

Living people
American engineers
Republican Party New Hampshire state senators
People from Franconia, New Hampshire
People from Grafton County, New Hampshire
United States Air Force officers
1943 births